A Doctor's Diary is a 1937 American drama film directed by Charles Vidor and written by David Boehm and Samuel Ornitz. The film stars George Bancroft, Helen Burgess, John Trent, Ruth Coleman, Ronald Sinclair and Molly Lamont. The film was released on January 22, 1937, by Paramount Pictures.

Plot

Cast 
George Bancroft as Dr. Clem Driscoll
Helen Burgess as Ruth Hanlon
John Trent as Dr. Dan Norris
Ruth Coleman as Catherine Stanwood
Ronald Sinclair as Michael Fielding 
Molly Lamont as Mrs. Fielding
Sidney Blackmer as Dr. Anson Ludlow
Charles Waldron as Dr. Ellery Stanwood 
Frank Puglia as Louie
Milburn Stone as Fred Clark
Sue Carol as Mrs. Mason

References

External links 
 

1937 films
American drama films
1937 drama films
Paramount Pictures films
Films directed by Charles Vidor
Films produced by B. P. Schulberg
American black-and-white films
1930s English-language films
1930s American films